The Empire of Liberty is a theme developed first by Thomas Jefferson to identify the responsibility of the United States to spread freedom across the world. Jefferson saw the mission of the U.S. in terms of setting an example, expansion into western North America, and by intervention abroad. Major exponents of the theme have been James Monroe (Monroe Doctrine), Andrew Jackson and James K. Polk (manifest destiny), Abraham Lincoln (Gettysburg Address), Theodore Roosevelt (Roosevelt Corollary), Woodrow Wilson (Wilsonianism), Franklin D. Roosevelt, Harry Truman (Truman Doctrine), Ronald Reagan (Reagan Doctrine), Bill Clinton, and George W. Bush.

In the history of U.S. foreign policy, the Empire of Liberty has provided motivation to fight the Spanish–American War (1898), World War I (1917-18), the later part of World War II (1941–1945), the Cold War (1947–1991), and the War on Terror (2001–present).

Thomas Jefferson

Jefferson used this phrase "Empire of Liberty" in 1780, while the American revolution was still being fought. His goal was the creation of an independent American state that would be proactive in its foreign policy while ensuring that American interventionism and expansionism would always be of a benevolent nature: 

Jefferson envisaged this "Empire" extending Westwards over the American continent, expansion into which he saw as crucial to the American future. During his presidency, this was in part achieved by his 1803 purchase of the Louisiana Territory from the French, almost doubling the area of the Republic and removing the main barrier to Westward expansion, stating that "I confess I look to this duplication of area for the extending of a government so free and economical as ours, as a great achievement to the mass of happiness which is to ensue".

However, this was not necessarily a politically unified Empire. "Whether we remain in one confederacy, or form Atlantic and Mississippi confederacies, I believe not very important to the happiness of either part." Despite this, Jefferson on other occasions seemed to stress the territorial inviolability of the Union.

In 1809 Jefferson wrote his successor James Madison:

Even in his later years, Jefferson saw no limit to the expansion of this Empire, writing "where this progress will stop no-one can say. Barbarism has, in the meantime, been receding before the steady step of amelioration; and will in time, I trust, disappear from the earth".

While Jefferson spoke loftily and idealistically about an Empire of Liberty abroad, he also envisioned creating a new form of American imperialism closer to home. The scholar Richard Drinnon observed that Jefferson spoke of establishing more amicable relations with Native Americans on America's Western Frontier at his "second inaugural address". During this address, Drinnon claims that Jefferson was quoted as stating that "humanity enjoins us to teach them (the Native Americans) agriculture and the domestic arts". In practice, however, Jefferson's imperial policy and implementation of the ideal of an Empire of Liberty for North America's Native American population was radically different. In Drinnon's view, there was a vast disparity between Jefferson's ideas and his actual actions. According to Drinnon, "Jefferson had initiated the Indian removal policy through his energetic efforts to "obtain from the native proprietors the whole left bank of the Mississippi." One major reason the lands of the aboriginal inhabitants had been so drastically reduced was Jefferson's acquisition of a hundred million acres in treaties shot through with fraud, bribery, and intimidation. And when Indians inter fered with white definitions of the national interest, as did the "backward" tribes of the Northwest in 1812, Jefferson's humanitarianism hardened: "These will relapse into barbarism and misery, lose numbers by war and want," he grimly pre dicted to John Adams, "and we shall be obliged to drive them, with the beasts of the forest into the Stony mountains.".

Monroe Doctrine
The Monroe Doctrine, a U.S. foreign policy initiative introduced in 1823, stated that efforts by European countries to colonise or interfere with states in the Americas will be viewed as acts of aggression requiring U.S. intervention, while the U.S. promised to refrain from interfering the affairs of established European colonies and respect the control of the European nations over their Caribbean colonies. Its justification was to make the "New World" safe for liberty and American-style republicanism, although many Latin Americans viewed the doctrine as simply justification for the United States to establish imperialistic relations with Latin America without having to worry about European interference. The Monroe Doctrine was invoked during the Second French intervention in Mexico and with the German Empire during the Zimmermann Telegram affair in 1917. After 1960 the Monroe Doctrine was invoked to roll back Communism from its new base in Castro's Cuba. Ronald Reagan emphasized the need to roll back Communism in Nicaragua and Grenada.

Reforming the world
American Protestant and Catholic religious activists began missionary work in "pagan" areas from the 1820s, and expanded operations worldwide in the late 19th century.

European nations (especially Britain, France and Germany) also had missionary programs, with these focused mostly on subjects within their own empires.  Americans went anywhere it was possible, and the Young Men's Christian Association (YMCA) and Young Women's Christian Association (YWCA) were among the many groups involved in missionary work. Others included the student volunteer movement and the King's Daughters. Among Catholics, the three Maryknoll organizations were especially active in China, Africa, and Latin America.

Religious reform organizations joined in attempts to spread modernity and worked to fight the corrupting effects of ignorance, disease, drugs and alcohol. For example, the World's Woman's Christian Temperance Union (WWCTU), a spinoff of the WCTU, had both strong religious convictions and a commitment to international efforts to shut down the liquor trade.  By the 1930s the more evangelical Protestant groups redoubled their efforts, but the more liberal Protestants had second thoughts about their advocacy, especially after the failure of prohibition at home cast doubt on how easy it might be to reform the world.

Other dimensions
Economic dimensions of the Empire of Liberty involved dissemination of American management methods (such as Taylorization, Fordism, and the assembly line), technology, and popular culture such as film.

In the 1930s, the Congress passed the Neutrality Acts, which attempted to avoid entering in conflicts with other nations. The United States became involved in World War II two years after its start.

Writers on the Left often capitalized on anti-imperialistic ideals by using the label American Empire in as a criticism of the United States foreign policy as imperialistic. Noam Chomsky and Chalmers Johnson are prominent spokesmen for this position, having long been critical of American imperialism. Their argument is that an imperialistic America represents an evil, and indeed the very thing that the "Empire of Liberty" was conceived to counter, imperialism. They recommend an alternate course of "dismantling the empire", by which the United States foreign policy is moved in a different direction. Puerto Rican poet and novelist Giannina Braschi proclaims the collapse of the World Trade Center as the end of the American Empire and its "colonial" hold on Puerto Rico in her post 9-11 work "United States of Banana" (2011).

See also
 American exceptionalism
 American imperialism
 Christian mission
 Civilizing mission
 Liberal internationalism
 White man's burden

References

Further reading

  Bacevich, Andrew J. American Empire: The Realities and Consequences of U.S. Diplomacy (2004) by a political scientist excerpt and text search
 Cogliano, Francis D. Emperor of Liberty: Thomas Jefferson's Foreign Policy (2014) 
 Ferguson, Niall. Colossus: The Rise and Fall of the American Empire (2005), by a conservative historian excerpt and text search
 Gordon, John Steele.  Empire of Wealth: The Epic History of American Economic Power (2005) by a conservative popular historian excerpt and text search
 Hampf, M. Michaela. Empire of Liberty: Die Vereinigten Staaten von der Reconstruction zum Spanisch-Amerikanischen Krieg, De Gruyter Oldenbourg, 2020 .
 Kagan, Robert. Dangerous Nation: America's Place in the World from Its Earliest Days to the Dawn of the Twentieth Century (2006), by a conservative
 Nau, Henry R. "Conservative Internationalism," Policy Review #150. 2008. pp. 3+. by a conservative online
 Reynolds, David. America, Empire of Liberty: A New History (2009); also BBC Radio 4 series
 Tucker, Robert W., and David C. Hendrickson. Empire of Liberty: The Statecraft of Thomas Jefferson (1990).
 Tyrrell, Ian. Woman's World/Woman's Empire – The Woman's Christian Temperance Union in International Perspective, 1880–1930, University of Carolina Press, 1991 
 Tyrrell, Ian. Reforming the World: The Creation of America's Moral Empire (Princeton University Press, 2010) 
 Wood, Gordon. Empire of Liberty: A History of the Early Republic, 1789–1815 (2009). excerpt and text search

American phraseology
History of liberalism
Internationalism
Imperialism
Thomas Jefferson
American culture
History of United States expansionism